Ideal Toy Company was an American toy company founded by Morris Michtom and his wife, Rose. During the post–World War II baby boom era, Ideal became the largest doll-making company in the United States. Their most popular dolls included Betsy Wetsy, Toni, Saucy Walker, Shirley Temple, Miss Revlon, Patti Playpal, Tammy, Thumbelina, Tiny Thumbelina, and Crissy. The company is also known for selling the Rubik's Cube.

History

Corporate history
Morris and Rose Michtom founded the Ideal Novelty and Toy Company in Brooklyn when they invented the Teddy bear in 1903. After Morris Michtom's death in 1938, the company changed its name to the Ideal Toy Company, and Michtom's nephew Abraham Katz became chief executive.

During World War II, the company's value rose from $2 million all the way to $11 million. The company's dolls were so popular during the post–World War II baby boom era, they began selling dolls under license in Canada, Australia, the United Kingdom, and Brazil.

Key Ideal employees during the 1950s, '60s, and '70s were Lionel A. Weintraub and Joseph C. Winkler. Weintraub, the son-in-law of Abraham Katz, joined the company in 1941 and rose to become president, chairman of the board, and chief executive officer. Winkler joined Ideal in 1956, rising to vice president by 1971.

In 1951, Ideal partnered with its competitors the American Character Doll Company and the Alexander Doll Company to establish the United States-Israeli Toy and Plastic Corporation. The company was created to produce material for toys in Israel and the U.S. Ideal CEO Abraham Katz was named president of the new company.

In 1968, the American Character Doll Company filed for bankruptcy, and Ideal acquired the defunct company's dyes, patents, and trademarks, as well as specific products like the "Tressy" Gro-Hair doll.

In late 1971, Ideal joined the New York Stock Exchange; valued at $71 million, it was one of the U.S.'s top three toy companies.

By 1970, Ideal had outgrown its manufacturing complex in Hollis, Queens. The company wanted to build a new plant in College Point, Queens (later the site of Shea Stadium), but was unable to strike a deal with the Lindsay administration. Consequently, the company opened a new facility in Newark, New Jersey, in the early 1970s, while continuing to operate its factory in Hollis.

In 1979, a Hungarian inventor, Erno Rubik, pitched his "Magic Cube" to Ideal Toy Company, who renamed it the "Rubik's cube." The toy was sold in stores beginning in 1980.

Ideal had earnings of $3.7 million in fiscal year 1979–1980, but lost $15.5 million in fiscal year 1980–1981. (Sales both years averaged around $150 million.) Trying to maximize profits on the Rubik's Cube craze, Ideal filed civil suits in May 1981 against dozens of distributors and retailers selling knockoff cubes.

In May 1981, Joseph Winkler was named Ideal's president, succeeding Lionel Weintraub, who remained chairman and CEO.

In 1982, the company moved its headquarters from Hollis, Queens, to Harmon Meadow, New Jersey. It was sold to CBS Toys later that year for around $58 million.

In 1984, CBS sold Ideal to Viewmaster International, which renamed itself View-Master Ideal in the process.

In 1989, View-Master Ideal was bought by Tyco Toys of Mt. Laurel, New Jersey, for $43.9 million. The Ideal line remained part of Tyco until Tyco's merger with Mattel, Inc., in 1997.

Ideal's United Kingdom assets were sold to Hasbro, which has since released Mouse Trap and KerPlunk under its MB Games brand. Other toys that originated with Ideal continue to be marketed and sold by other companies, including Rubik's Cube by Hasbro and Magic 8-ball by Mattel.

The Ideal trademarks, and most toy molds not purchased by Hasbro or Mattel, were purchased by Jay Horowitz of American Plastic Equipment, who later transferred all rights to American Plastic Equipment's subsidiary, American Classic Toys. Mr. Horowitz licensed the trademark and toy rights to Plaza Toys, to be used on its Fiddlestix building sticks products, and eventually sold the mark and toy rights in January 2011 to Poof-Slinky.

In January 2014, the Ideal brand and toy rights became part of a new company, Alex Brands, after the May 2013 acquisition of Alex Toys by Propel Equity Partners.

In early 2019, Jay Horowitz of American Classic Toys, entered into an exclusive license agreement with the Juna Group to represent select Ideal brands - not included in the sale to Poof-Slinky - in all categories outside of toys and playthings, worldwide.

Products history
Ideal began making dolls in 1907 to complement its line of teddy bears. Their first doll was “Yellow Kid” from Richard Felton Outcault's comic strip of the same name. After that Ideal began making a line of baby and character dolls such as Naughty Marietta (from the Victor Herbert operetta), and Admiral Dot. Ideal advertised their dolls as "unbreakable," since they were made of composition, a material made of sawdust and glue. Ideal produced over 200 variations of dolls throughout the composition era.

In 1914, Ideal had a boy doll launched named the Uneeda Kid, after a biscuit company. It was patented on December 8, 1914. The 15-inch boy doll wore a blue and white bloomer suit and held a box of Uneeda Biscuits under his arm.

One of Ideal's most lasting products was Betsy Wetsy, introduced in 1934 and in production for more than 50 years. The doll was named after the daughter of Abraham Katz, the head of the company. Ideal, via the Betsy Wetsy doll, was also one of the first doll manufacturers to produce an African American version of a popular doll. In 2003, the Toy Industry Association named Betsy Wetsy to its Century of Toys List, a compilation commemorating the 100 most memorable and most creative toys of the 20th century.

Debuting in 1934, the Shirley Temple doll was their best-selling doll. Ideal followed this with licensed Disney dolls and a Judy Garland doll.

Two cosmetics-based doll series were launched after World War II: Toni was introduced at the end of the 1940s, followed by the 1950s-dominating Miss Revlon series.

Ideal had a hobby division in the 1950s, but shifted from that to games in 1962. By the early 1970s, 30% of the company's sales were games such as Mouse Trap and Hands Down.

Doll designer Judith Albert worked for Ideal Toy Company from 1960 to 1982. Master sculptor Vincent J. DeFilippo spent 27 years creating dolls for Ideal from 1963 to 1980. Some of the company's most popular dolls during this period were Tammy (1962–1966), Flatsy dolls (1969–1973), Crissy (1969–1974), and Tressy (1970–1972).

Popular Ideal toys in the 1970s included a full line of Evel Knievel toys, Snoopy toys, and the Tuesday Taylor and Wake-up Thumbelina dolls.

For a short time, the company had a huge seller with the Magic Cube, which it imported from Hungary in 1980 and renamed Rubik's Cube. The Rubik's Cube was inducted into the National Toy Hall of Fame in 2014.

Novelties and toys manufactured by Ideal

Toys and games

 Alexander's Star
 Alligator Game
 Astrobase
 Babar
 Batman Playset
 Battle Action Tank Trap
 Battlefield Blast
 Battling Spaceships
 Battling Tops
 Beat The "8" Ball
 Big Bird Storymagic
 Bing Bang Boing
 Boaterific
 Bongo Kongo
 Bop the Beetle
 Be a King or Queen outfit
 Buck-a-roo!
 Building Boards
 Checkpoint: Danger!
 Careful
 Clancy the Great
 Comic Heroines (AKA Superqueen)
 Composa-Tune
 Cover-up
 Criss-Cross
 Crossfire
 Deduction
 Disney Dough
 Don't Tip The Waiter
 Don't Upset Me
 Dukes of Hazzard Racing Set
 Dr. Evil
 Electroman
 Electronic Detective
 Electronic Jet Pilot (Cockpit Instrument Panel)
 Escape from Skull Canyon
 Evel Knievel toys
 Fiddlestix
 Flintstones toys
 Frontier Logs
 Game of the Generals
 Gaylord the Walking Bassett Hound
 Gunfight at OK Corral Playset
 Hand Puppets (DC Comics Superheroes i.e. Batman, Robin, Wonder Woman, TV Series Characters i.e. Mr. Rogers Neighborhood, The Addams Family, The Munsters )
 Hands Down
 Hang on Harvey
 Hoopla
 Howdy Doody doll
 Impact
 ITC Models
 The Game of Jaws
 Jay J. Armes action figure.
 Justice League of America Playset
 KerPlunk
 Kindles
 King Kong
 King Zor
 Lamb Chop puppet
 Magic 8-ball
 Magic Shot
 Magilla Gorilla
 Maniac
 Manglor
 Marblehead
 Mark Three
 Mighty Mo
 Missing Link
 Model cars
 Monkey Stix
 Motorific
 Mr. Machine
 Mr. Rogers Neighborhood Trolley
 My Dog Has Fleas
 Odd Ogg
 Oh, Nuts!
 Pac-Man Panic
 Pay-Off
 Payoff Machine
 Peter Potamus
 Poison Ivy
 Poppin Hoppies
 Powermite Mini Tools
 Phantom Rayder Ship 1964
 R-r-r-raw Power
 Rack 'N' Roll Bowling
 Rebound
 Ricochet Rabbit & Droop-a-Long
 Robert the Robot
 Robo Force
 Robot Commando
 Rocks & Bugs & Things
 Rubik's Cube (license)
 Ryan Oakes Magic Show
 Scare Cycles
 Shaker Maker
 Skeeters (micro sized toy cars (12 different models plus carrying case and 2 track sets)
 Sky Battle
 Smokey the Bear Ranger
 Snap Bowling
 Solar Works 
 Speedball (Electronic)
 Stretchie dolls
 Super City (toy)
 Sure Shot Baseball
 Swack!
 Tank Command
 Teddy Bear
 Think & Learn (Preschool play sets)
 ThunderStreak (hydro wing rubberband powered toy) 1967
 Tiger Island
 Tin Can Alley
 Tiny Mighty Mo
 Tornado Bowl
 Toss Across
 TCR: Total Control Racing
 Triple Up
 Up Against Time
 Upset
 U.S. Marine Air-Sea Rescue Floating Mechanical Seaplane 
 U.S. Royal Giant Tire Mechanical Toy - from the New York World's Fair 1964
 Video Varmints 
 Walt Disney toys
 Zeroids

Board games

 The $128,000 Question
 All-Pro Basketball National Basketball Association Game
 All-Pro Football National Football League Game
 All-Pro Hockey National Hockey League Game
 Bible Trivia
 Blast (The Game of Blast)
 The Chase
 Cloak and Dagger
 Crazy Clock Game
 The Diners' Club Credit Card Game 
 Double Exposure
 Electra Woman and Dyna Girl (board game)
 Fish Bait
 The Fugitive
 Get Smart
 The Great Escape
 The Hollywood Squares
 I Vant to Bite Your Finger
 Let's Make A Deal
 Mouse Trap
 Mystic Skull: The Game Of Voodoo
 Old Maid
 Pop O Matic Yipes!
 Rain Rain Go Away 
 Rattle Me Bones
 Salvo
 The Sinking of The Titanic
 Solid Gold Music Trivia
 Ten Commandments
 Tic-Tac-Dough
 Tip-It
 The Winning Ticket

Dolls

DeFilippo Dolls

 Baby Baby
 Baby Dreams — the doll with "velvet skin"
 Baby Tickle Tickle
 Betsy Wetsy
 Dorothy Hamill
 Evel Knievel toys
 Jody An Old Fashioned Girl (1979)
 Joey Stivic
 KaMy Bottle Baby
 Karen & her magic carriage
 Lazy Dazy (1970s)
 Magic Hair Crissy
 Movin Groovin Cricket/Tressy
 Patti Playpal
 Rub-a-Dub Doggie
 Rub-a-Dub Dolly
 Sara Stimson/Shirley Temple
 Spinderella Flatsy dolls
 Tearie Betsy Wetsy
 Tiffany Taylor
 Tiny Tears (after 1968 when American Character Doll Company went out of business)
 Tippy Tumbles (American Character Doll Company)
 Tuesday Taylor and Taylor Jones
 Upsy Dazy
 Wake up Thumbelina
 Zem 21 & Knight of Darkness

Other Ideal dolls

 Bibsy — 23" baby doll (1960s and 1970s)
 Bye Bye Baby (1960s)
 Captain Action (1966–1968)
 Cream Puff Baby (1950s)
 Crissy — fashion doll with growing hair feature
 Crown Princess— 10" vinyl glamour doll
 Deanna Durbin
 Dick Tracy — including Bonnie Braids and Sparkle Plenty
 Flatsy dolls — flat vinyl dolls in two sizes: tall "model" dolls and smaller childlike dolls; many had blue, pink and other bright hair colors; came in picture frame packaging
 Flexy — composition head and hands, wooden body and feet, and posable tubular wire mesh arms and legs
 Flossie Flirt — composition (1920s and 1930s)
 Hugee Girl baby dolls (1950s)
 Harmony
 I Love Lucy 28 inch Rag Doll (1950s) - a rare promotional give-away in partnership with Philip Morris Company, NY
 Jane Withers
 Jelly Belly
 Judy Garland — part of publicity for original theatrical release of The Wizard of Oz (1939/1940)
 Kissy doll
 Little Lost Baby — three faces: happy, sad, sleeping, also with sounds; "I'm Little Lost Baby. You can make me happy!" (1968)
 Little Miss Revlon — 10" vinyl glamour doll, advertising tie-in with Revlon cosmetics
 Lolly doll
 Magic Lips
 Mama doll
 Petite Princess Fantasy — dollhouse furniture
 Playpal dolls: Patti, Penny, Suzi, Bonnie, Johnny, Peter, Daddy's Girl
 Playtex Dryper Baby
 Princess Patti Fantasy — dollhouse furniture
 Sara Ann
 Saucy Walker
 Shirley Temple
 Snookie dolls (Pete & Repete)
 Snuggles dolls
 Tammy
 The Wonderful Wizard of Oz (1986)
 Thirsty Baby doll (1960s)
 Thumbelina
 Toni — hard plastic doll, advertising tie-in with Toni Home Permanent
 Tressy — one of the Gro-Hair dolls
 Uneeda Kid — early composition doll, advertising tie-in with Uneeda Biscuit Co.

References

 
Toy companies of the United States
Game manufacturers
Mattel
Defunct toy manufacturers
Toy soldier manufacturing companies
Doll manufacturing companies
Teddy bear manufacturers
1907 establishments in New York City
Former CBS Corporation subsidiaries